The Collection is a 2011 compilation album by American singer Frank Sinatra. Produced by Greyhound Media Limited, the album consists of 2 discs: The Swing Collection and The Ballads Collection, each containing 25 original recordings.

Track listing

Disc One: The Swing Collection
 Come Fly with Me – 3:19
 Just One of Those Things – 3:15
 All of Me – 2:08
 Night and Day – 3:59
 I Get a Kick out of You – 2:53
 The Lady Is a Tramp – 3:16
 Cheek to Cheek – 3:05
 Love and Marriage – 2:37
 You Make Me Feel So Young – 2:55
 I've Got You Under My Skin – 3:42
 Witchcraft – 2:53
 Chicago – 2:11
 They Can't Take That Away from Me – 1:57
 Makin' Whoopee – 3:05
 Let's Get Away from It All – 2:09
 Too Close for Comfort – 2:33
 (Love Is) The Tender Trap – 2:56
 Too Marvelous for Words – 2:27
 How About You? – 2:45
 Jeepers Creepers – 2:24
 It Happened in Monterey – 2:33
 Nice Work If You Can Get It – 2:21
 Hey! Jealous Lover – 2:22
 Learnin' the Blues – 3:01
 Nice 'n' Easy – 2:47

Disc Two: The Ballads Collection
 All the Way – 2:52
 Young at Heart – 2:50
 I've Got the World on a String – 2:10
 Three Coins in the Fountain – 3:03
 April in Paris – 2:48
 This Love of Mine – 3:36
 Everybody Loves Somebody – 3:43
 Someone to Watch over Me – 2:57
 Stormy Weather – 3:21
 My Funny Valentine – 2:32
 In the Wee Small Hours of the Morning – 2:59
 What Is This Thing Called Love – 2:35
 Guess I'll Hang My Tears out to Dry – 3:57
 Autumn Leaves – 2:50
 Time After Time – 3:27
 Mood Indigo – 3:30
 Love Is Here to Stay – 2:39
 Pennies from Heaven – 2:41
 I'll Never Smile Again – 3:46
 Around the World – 3:19
 Autumn in New York – 3:21
 Old Devil Moon – 2:05
 I Get Along Without You Very Well – 3:42
 You're Getting to Be a Habit With Me – 2:17
 One for My Baby (And One More for the Road) – 4:24

References

2011 compilation albums
Frank Sinatra compilation albums